Zhang Peilun (1848–1903) was a Chinese government official of the late Qing dynasty, who served as a naval commander during the Sino-French War (August 1884–April 1885).

Early life
Zhang Peilun was born in Hangzhou on November 24, 1848. His father, Zhang Yintang (張印塘, 1797–1854), was a mid-level government official who died when Zhang Peilun was only a child, which left the family in genteel poverty. Zhang was, by all reports, a bright and studious child. After passing the provincial imperial examination at age 23 and the metropolitan one at 24, he came under the tutelage of Li Hongzao and quickly rose to prominence.

Political Views
Zhang was one of the foremost members of the so-called Purist Party (清流黨) led by Zhang Zhidong, an extremist group which urged resistance to French encroachment in north Vietnam in the early 1880s, even at the cost of war with France, in opposition to the more moderate stance advocated by Li Hongzhang and his supporters.

Battle of Fuzhou
Shortly before the outbreak of the Sino-French War, Zhang was appointed imperial commissioner, with responsibility for the defense of Fujian province.  His Fujian Fleet was defeated and almost annihilated by the French Far East Squadron, under the command of Admiral Amédée Courbet, at the Battle of Fuzhou (23 August 1884).

Zhang had made no serious attempt to coordinate the resistance of the Fujian fleet, and was demoted by the Empress Dowager Cixi on 19 September 1884 and replaced as Fujian defense commissioner by the veteran general Zuo Zongtang. He was then exiled to serve as a soldier in Zhangjiakou, a rural town in Northeast China.

Return from exile
After returning to Beijing/Tianjin in 1888, Zhang managed to find work as a secretary/scribe for his former political enemy, Li Hongzhang. Reportedly, Li was so impressed with Zhang that he encouraged his eldest daughter, Li Ju’ou (李菊藕, 1866–1912), marry to Zhang, despite the couple's disparate ages and opposition from Li Ju’ou's mother.

Nonetheless, Li Hongzhang still refused to help Zhang enter public life again and Zhang devoted himself to his literary ambitions instead. He and his family moved to Nanjing after the wedding and Zhang, with the help of his wife, began editing the various works that he had begun writing while in exile. The couple eventually co-wrote a cookbook and a martial arts novel.

In 1903, Zhang died in Nanjing at the age of 56 due to an unspecified liver disease. His wife died nine years later and they were buried together. Their graves were exhumed and desecrated during the Cultural Revolution five decades later.

Family
Zhang married a total of three times and had three sons and a daughter.

He and his first wife, Zhu Zhixiang (朱芷薌, d.1879) had two sons together, Zhang Zhicang (張志滄, who died young) and Zhang Zhiqian (張志潛, b. circa 1879). 

After the death of his first wife, he eventually remarried, but his second wife, Bian Cuiyu (邊粹玉, d.1886), died while he was in exile. 

In 1888, he married Li Ju‘ou. His third marriage was reportedly a happy one and produced a son and a daughter, Zhang Zhiyi (張志沂, 1896–1953) and Zhang Maoyuan (張茂淵, 1898–1991).

Zhang Zhiyi's daughter (and Zhang Peilun's granddaughter), Eileen Chang, is one of the most famous Chinese writers of the 20th century.

Notes

External links
 豐才嗇遇的張佩綸 (in Chinese)

References

 Chere, L., The Diplomacy of the Sino-French War (1883–1885): Global Complications of an Undeclared War (Notre Dame, Indiana, 1988)
 Eastman, L., Throne and Mandarins: China's Search for a Policy during the Sino-French Controversy (Stanford, 1984)
 Lung Chang [龍章], Yueh-nan yu Chung-fa chan-cheng [越南與中法戰爭, Vietnam and the Sino-French War] (Taipei, 1993)
 

1848 births
1903 deaths
Qing dynasty admirals
Politicians from Tangshan
People of the Sino-French War
Qing dynasty politicians from Hebei
Generals from Hebei
Ministers of Zongli Yamen